John Stanley Plaskett  (November 17, 1865 – October 17, 1941) was a Canadian astronomer.

Career 
He worked as a machinist, and was offered a job as a mechanician at the Department of Physics at the University of Toronto, constructing apparatus and assisting with demonstrations during lectures.  He found this so interesting that at the age of 30 he enrolled as an undergraduate in mathematics and physics.  He stayed at the university until 1903, doing research on color photography.

His formal astronomical career did not start until 1903, when he was appointed to the staff at Dominion Observatory in Ottawa, Ontario. He measured radial velocities and studied spectroscopic binaries, and performed the first detailed analysis of galactic structure. His mechanical background was very useful for constructing various instruments. He became first director of the Dominion Astrophysical Observatory in Victoria, British Columbia in 1917 (not to be confused with the old Dominion Observatory in Ottawa).

Family and legacy 
His son, Harry Hemley Plaskett, also pursued a very successful career in astronomy, winning the Gold Medal of the Royal Astronomical Society in 1963, thereby making the Plasketts one of the very few families to boast more than one Medal winner.

An authoritative biography of JS Plaskett was published in 2018, coinciding with the centennial of the Dominion Astrophysical Observatory.

Honours

Awards

Gold Medal of the Royal Astronomical Society (1930)
Rumford Prize (1930)
Bruce Medal (1932)
Henry Draper Medal from the National Academy of Sciences (1934)
CBE

Named after him

NRC-HIA Plaskett Fellowship
The crater Plaskett on the Moon
Mount Plaskett
the Plaskett Medal
Asteroid 2905 Plaskett (with his son H.H. Plaskett)
Plaskett's star
Plaskett Place (street on which he built his home, in Esquimalt, British Columbia)

References

External links

Obituaries
 MNRAS 102 (1942) 70
 Obs 64 (1941) 183 (one paragraph)
 PASP 53 (1941) 323

1865 births
1941 deaths
20th-century Canadian astronomers
University of Toronto alumni
Fellows of the Royal Society of Canada
Canadian Commanders of the Order of the British Empire
Recipients of the Gold Medal of the Royal Astronomical Society
Persons of National Historic Significance (Canada)
Canadian Fellows of the Royal Society
Fellows of the American Physical Society